This is a list of the districts of England ordered by population density, based on population estimates for  from the Office for National Statistics. The densities are calculated by dividing the latest Population Estimate by the Standard Area Measurement.

Less than 100 / km²

See also
 List of English districts by population
 List of English districts by area
 List of English districts and their ethnic composition

References

Districts of England
Districts of England by Population Density
English districts